Sperbeck is a surname. Notable people with the surname include:

Jeff Sperbeck, American NFL certified contract advisor 
Marshall Sperbeck (born 1960), American college football coach and former player
Thomas Sperbeck (born 1994), American football player

See also
Saerbeck